Pleurocybella porrigens is a species of fungus in the family Phyllotopsidaceae. The species is widespread in temperate forests of the Northern Hemisphere.  P. porrigens, known as the angel wing, is a white-rot wood-decay fungus on conifer wood, particularly hemlock (genus Tsuga). The flesh is thin and fragile compared to the oyster mushrooms (Pleurotus ssp.).

Pleurocybella porrigens was once regarded as edible, but in the early 21st century, this was brought into question by deadly poisonings associated with its consumption.

Synonyms for Pleurocybella porrigens include Pleurotus porrigens, Phyllotus porrigens, Dendrosarcus porrigens, Pleurotellus porrigens, and Nothopanus porrigens.

Description 
The mushroom species is distinguished by its fruit bodies, which begin as a pure white and then form a tinge of yellow over time. The stipe is either very short or completely absent, and the flesh has a faint but pleasant smell.

Toxicity

Although P. porrigens was once generally regarded as edible, as of 2011, it has been implicated in two documented outbreaks involving fatal encephalopathy. Both of these incidents were in Japan, and most victims had pre-existing kidney disorders.

The first incident occurred in September and October 2004 across nine prefectures in Japan, and involved the sickening of 59 people and the eventual death of 17.  Most of those who died had pre-existing liver problems, and the average age of those affected was 70.  Death occurred between 13 and 29 days after the onset of symptoms, and the onset of symptoms occurred at most three weeks after consumption of P. porrigens.

The second incident occurred in 2009, when a 65-year-old man who had been on hemodialysis died from acute encephalopathy after eating P. porrigens.

The mechanism of action for the toxicity of P. porrigens has not been definitively established, but several possibilities have been suggested.  It has been demonstrated that P. porrigens contains an unusual unstable amino acid which is toxic to the brain cells of rats in cell culture studies, but it has not yet been possible to definitively determine that this was the cause of the fatal encephalopathies.  Other mechanisms have been suggested for P. porrigens's apparent toxicity, including the possibility that the fungus may contain toxic levels of cyanide salts.

See also

List of deadly fungi

References

External links

Fungi described in 1796
Fungi of Asia
Fungi of Europe
Fungi of North America
Deadly fungi